Cylindrocline is a genus of flowering plant in the family Asteraceae.

It contains two species, both endemic to the Island of Mauritius in the Indian Ocean.

 Cylindrocline commersonii Cass.
 Cylindrocline lorencei A.J.Scott

References

 
Asteraceae genera
Endemic flora of Mauritius
Taxonomy articles created by Polbot